Sean Morrell (born 23 August 1986) is a Fijian international rugby union player.

He played with the Ponsonby RFC winning the Gallaher Shield and also for King Country in the Heartland Championship. In 2011 he joined Romanian club CSM Baia Mare.

He won only one cap for Fiji, against Japan in the Pacific Nations Cup in June 2009. Next month he was selected for the Fiji sevens team and won gold at the 2009 World Games.

References

External links

 
 
 
 

1986 births
Living people
Fiji international rugby union players
Fijian people of British descent
Fijian expatriate sportspeople in New Zealand
Fijian expatriate sportspeople in Romania
Expatriate rugby union players in New Zealand
Expatriate rugby union players in Romania
CSM Știința Baia Mare players
Fijian rugby sevens players
Rugby union flankers